The Black River is a river located in North Queensland, Australia.

The headwaters of the river rise near Ben Lomond East in the Great Dividing Range and flow in a northeasterly direction. The river flows roughly parallel with the Hervey Range Developmental Road past Mount Cataract and Mount Black on the Bohle Plains.

The river descends  over its  course.

A total of 22 species of fish have been found in the river, including the glassfish, Roman nose Goby, Fly-specked hardyhead, Golden Gudgeon, Jungle Perch, Barramundi, oxeye herring, eastern rainbowfish, spotted scat, and Crescent Perch.

The river is named after John Melton Black who was a pastoralist, merchant and a settler of Townsville. The outer Townsville suburb of Black River is named after the river which flows through northern side of the area.

The river is the western boundary of the Townsville suburb of Alice River.

See also

References

Rivers of Queensland
North Queensland
Bodies of water of the Coral Sea